Supercock (also known as Bet to Kill and A Fistful of Feathers) is a 1975 comedy film directed by Gus Trikonis and starring Ross Hagen.  The film also stars Nancy Kwan.  

Seeing as the original title was rather controversial, the film has been released under several different names, the most notable being A Fistful of Feathers.

Plot
An American cowboy and his prized pet rooster, Friendly, travel to the Philippines to enter the First International Cockfighting Olympics and a for chance to win $100,000.

Cast
Ross Hagen - Seth Calhoun
Nancy Kwan - Yuki Chan

References

External links

1975 films
1975 comedy films
American independent films
Troma Entertainment films
Films directed by Gus Trikonis
Cockfighting in film
1970s English-language films
1970s American films